Royal Southampton Yacht Club is located on the Beaulieu River in Hampshire. It received its Royal Charter in 1875 making it one of the oldest Yacht clubs in the UK.

Locations 
 1885 to 1957 - Clubhouse located in Above Bar, Southampton.
 1957 to 1988 - Northlands Road, opposite the County Cricket ground.
 1988 to 2018 - Clubhouse in Ocean village marina.
 1964 to present - Clubhouse at Gins, on Beaulieu River.

See also

Royal Southern Yacht Club

References

External links
 Official website

Royal yacht clubs
Sports clubs in Hampshire
Yacht clubs in England
Sport in Southampton
Organisations based in Hampshire with royal patronage
Port of Southampton